Rachel Helen Candy (born 23 July 1986) is a New Zealand former cricketer who played as a right-arm medium bowler. She appeared in 18 One Day Internationals and 10 Twenty20 Internationals for New Zealand between 2007 and 2013. She played domestic cricket for Central Districts, Canterbury and Surrey.

References

External links

1986 births
Living people
Cricketers from Palmerston North
New Zealand women cricketers
New Zealand women One Day International cricketers
New Zealand expatriate sportspeople in England
New Zealand women Twenty20 International cricketers
Central Districts Hinds cricketers
Canterbury Magicians cricketers
Surrey women cricketers